Glen Lyn is a town in Giles County, Virginia, United States, at the confluence of the East and New rivers. The population was 115 at the 2010 census, down from 151 at the 2000 census. It is part of the Blacksburg–Christiansburg Metropolitan Statistical Area.

Geography
Glen Lyn is located in northwestern Giles County at  (37.373080, -80.860906), on both sides of the New River. It is bordered to the west by the East River and by the state of West Virginia. U.S. Route 460 passes through the town, leading east (upstream along the New River)  to Rich Creek and west  to Princeton, West Virginia.

Climate
The climate in this area has mild differences between highs and lows, and there is adequate rainfall year-round.  According to the Köppen Climate Classification system, Glen Lyn has a marine west coast climate, abbreviated "Cfb" on climate maps.

Demographics

As of the census of 2000, there were 151 people, 57 households, and 38 families living in the town. The population density was 233.1 people per square mile (89.7/km2). There were 62 housing units at an average density of 95.7 per square mile (36.8/km2). The racial makeup of the town was 100.00% White. Hispanic or Latino of any race were 0.66% of the population.

There were 57 households, out of which 36.8% had children under the age of 18 living with them, 54.4% were married couples living together, 12.3% had a female householder with no husband present, and 31.6% were non-families. 29.8% of all households were made up of individuals, and 15.8% had someone living alone who was 65 years of age or older. The average household size was 2.65 and the average family size was 3.36.

In the town, the population was spread out, with 27.8% under the age of 18, 11.3% from 18 to 24, 28.5% from 25 to 44, 15.9% from 45 to 64, and 16.6% who were 65 years of age or older. The median age was 35 years. For every 100 females there were 93.6 males. For every 100 females age 18 and over, there were 78.7 males.

The median income for a household in the town was $28,750, and the median income for a family was $38,250. Males had a median income of $22,813 versus $18,750 for females. The per capita income for the town was $12,706. There were 10.8% of families and 17.7% of the population living below the poverty line, including 31.7% of under eighteens and 7.7% of those over 64.

References

External links
Town website

Towns in Giles County, Virginia